Pilaira is a genus of zygote fungi described in 1875.

Species 
The genus consists of the following species:

 Pilaira anomala (Ces.) J. Schröt.
 Pilaira australis Urquhart, Coulon & Idnurm
 Pilaira caucasica Milko
 Pilaira dimidiata Grove
 Pilaira fimetaria
 Pilaira moreaui Y. Ling
 Pilaira nigrescens
 Pilaira praeampla R.Y. Zheng & X.Y. Liu
 Pilaira subangularis R.Y. Zheng & X.Y. Liu

References 

Zygomycota genera
Mucoraceae